COUP-TF1 (COUP Transcription Factor 1) also known as NR2F1 (Nuclear Receptor subfamily 2, group F, member 1) is a protein that in humans is encoded by the NR2F1 gene. This protein is a member of nuclear hormone receptor  family of steroid hormone receptors.

Function 

Coup (chicken ovalbumin upstream promoter) transcription factor binds to the ovalbumin promoter and, in conjunction with another protein (S300-II) stimulates initiation of transcription. COUP-TF1 binds to both direct repeats and palindromes of the 5'-AGGTCA-3' motif.

Interactions 

COUP-TFI has been shown to interact with:
 BCL11A,
 BCL11B,
 COPS2, and
 ESR1.

Clinical

Mutations in this gene have been associated with Bosch-Boonstra-Schaaf optic atrophy syndrome.

References

External links

Further reading 

 
 
 
 
 
 
 
 
 
 
 
 
 
 
 
 
 
 

Intracellular receptors
Transcription factors